The Knights of the Southern Cross (New Zealand) (“KSCNZ”) is a fraternal order of Catholic men committed to promoting the Christian way of life. It is organised in 18 branches throughout the six dioceses of New Zealand.

Objectives 
 To be an organised body of Catholic Men giving entire loyalty to the Apostolic See, to the Hierarchy and the Clergy in all things appertaining to the Catholic faith.
 To support members in their vocation and mission as Catholic Men.
 To work for the spiritual, intellectual and material welfare of members and their families.
 To spread the Gospel for the conversion of souls and the growth of the Church.
 To restore all things in Christ by working for the moral and social welfare of the country.
 To help Catholic Youth develop to be “fully mature in the fullness of Christ himself.” (Eph.4:13)
 To co-operate with other organisations in furtherance of the objectives.
 To achieve all these objects through Charity, Unity and Fraternity.

Membership 
Membership is open to all Roman Catholic males in good standing at least 18 years of age or older.

Associations 
Through the International Alliance of Catholic Knights, the Knights of the Southern Cross (New Zealand) are associated with the Knights of the Southern Cross (Australia), the Knights of Columbus, the Knights of Saint Columbanus, the Knights of Da Gama and the Knights of Saint Columba.

The National Secretariat is in Wellington. Michael Riley is the Supreme Knight.

Catholic Church in New Zealand
Southern Cross